The 14th Parliament of Antigua and Barbuda was elected on 12 June 2014.

Members

Senate

Changes to the Senate during the session

House of Representatives 
The longest serving member in this House of Representatives was Robin Yearwood, at the time in his 9th term.

References 

Parliaments of Antigua and Barbuda